The J. C. Carly House, listed on the National Register of Historic Places, is a historic home located in Curtis Park, Sacramento, California.

History
James C. Carly was a wealthy real estate developer who owned much of the land that is now Curtis Park in Sacramento (named after rancher William Curtis). Built in one of the earliest suburbs of Sacramento, the Carly house was constructed in 1922. The area the home was built in what would become a center of post-World War I housing tracts. The architectural design was completed by Dean & Dean, locally known due to their work on the Memorial Auditorium, Westminster Presbyterian Church, and the Sutter Club, among others. Carly's real estate dealings had a downturn during the Great Depression and he had to downgrade his living conditions, moving out in 1933. The home was later occupied by a local business owner until 1959.

References

Houses on the National Register of Historic Places in California
Mission Revival architecture in California
Houses completed in 1922
Houses in Sacramento, California
National Register of Historic Places in Sacramento, California